Kyaikmaraw Township is a township of Mawlamyine District in the Mon State of Myanmar. Its principal town is Kyaikmaraw.

Sources

Townships of Mon State